Buzzell is a surname. Notable people with the surname include:

Colby Buzzell (born 1976), American writer and blogger
Edward Buzzell (1895–1985), American film director
Fannie M. Buzzell, American politician
Hodgdon C. Buzzell (1878–1948), American lawyer and mayor
John Buzzell (1766–1863), Free Will Baptist
John R. Buzzell, leader of 1834 Ursuline Convent riots
Loring Buzzell (1927–1959), American music publisher; nephew of Edward Buzzell and president of Hecht-Lancaster & Buzzell Music
Reginald W. Buzzell (1894–1959), American brigadier general

See also
John H. Bunzel, author